Tamer Hamed Ali Zinhom Muhammad (also Tamer Hamed, ; born February 4, 1974) is an Egyptian former swimmer, who specialized in sprint freestyle and butterfly events. He is a two-time Olympian (1996 and 2000), and an Egyptian record holder in the 50 m freestyle.

Hamed made his official debut at the 1996 Summer Olympics in Atlanta. He failed to reach the top 16 final in any of his individual events, finishing forty-sixth in the 100 m butterfly (56.46), and forty-seventh each in the 50 m freestyle (24.02) and 100 m freestyle (52.16).

At the 2000 Summer Olympics in Sydney, Hamed competed only in a sprint freestyle double. He achieved FINA B-standards of 23.39 (50 m freestyle) and 52.14 (100 m freestyle) from the Egyptian Championships in Cairo. In the 100 m freestyle, Hamed placed forty-fourth on the morning prelims. Swimming in heat four, he edged out Colombia's Fernando Jácome and Singapore's Mark Chay to race for a fourth seed by a tenth of a second (0.10) in 52.14. Two days later, in the 50 m freestyle, Hamed participated in heat five against seven other swimmers, including three-time Olympians Richard Sam Bera of Indonesia and Allan Murray of the Bahamas, top 16 finalist in Atlanta four years earlier. He raced to a fifth seed and forty-sixth overall in 23.77, just a small fraction off his entry time.

References

1974 births
Living people
Egyptian male swimmers
Olympic swimmers of Egypt
Swimmers at the 1996 Summer Olympics
Swimmers at the 2000 Summer Olympics
Egyptian male freestyle swimmers
Male butterfly swimmers
Sportspeople from Cairo
African Games medalists in swimming
African Games bronze medalists for Egypt
Competitors at the 1995 All-Africa Games